is a railway station on the Hokuriku Main Line in the city of Sakai, Fukui Prefecture, Japan, operated by the West Japan Railway Company (JR West).

Lines

Station layout
The station consists of two unnumbered side platforms connected by a footbridge. The station is staffed.

Platforms

History
It was renamed to Maruoka Station on 15 February 1902. With the privatization of Japanese National Railways (JNR) on 1 April 1987, the station came under the control of JR West.

Passenger statistics
In fiscal 2016, the station was used by an average of 1,112 passengers daily (boarding passengers only).

Surrounding area
Maruoka Castle
 Sakai Post Office

See also
 List of railway stations in Japan

References

External links

  

Railway stations in Fukui Prefecture
Stations of West Japan Railway Company
Railway stations in Japan opened in 1897
Hokuriku Main Line
Sakai, Fukui